Black Sheep is a 1935 American drama film directed by Allan Dwan and starring Edmund Lowe, Claire Trevor, and Tom Brown.

The film's sets were designed by the art director Duncan Cramer.

Plot
Aboard a luxury liner, gambler John Francis Dugan makes the acquaintance of socialite Jeanette Foster, who has a reputation for using men to get her way. Jeanette cajoles him into sneaking her into First Class, where they see young Fred Curtis lose $12,000 at poker to a couple of oilmen, Belcher and Schmelling.

Fred's troubles grow worse when the haughty Millicent Bath has his markers and threatens to tell the police unless he helps her at Customs, sneaking some valuable pearls into the country that she ha stolen. Fred is so forlorn that he considers jumping overboard, until Jeanette stops him.

Dugan decides to help. He wins back Fred's debts at cards. When they return to Fred's stateroom, Dugan spots a photo of Fred's deceased mother and is shocked to discover that she was his ex-wife. Fred is his long-lost son.

Mrs. Bath has hidden the pearls inside a cane's handle. Dugan distracts her, replaces the pearls with pills, then hides the valuables inside the pocket of Belcher, the oilman. They spill out at Customs and are claimed by Mrs. Bath to belong to her, causing her to be taken away by the authorities. Dugan has become fond of Jeannette, who promises to change her old ways.

Cast
 Edmund Lowe as John Francis Dugan  
 Claire Trevor as Jeanette Foster  
 Tom Brown as Fred Curtis  
 Eugene Pallette as Colonel Upton Calhoun Belcher  
 Adrienne Ames as Mrs. Millicent Caldwell Bath  
 Herbert Mundin as Oscar  
 Ford Sterling as Mather  
 Jed Prouty as Orville Schmelling  
 Billy Bevan as Alfred 
 David Torrence as Captain Savage 
 Mary Blackwood as Edith  
 Wade Boteler as Customs Officer  
 Don Brodie as Reporter  
 Tex Brodus as Passenger 
 Edward Cecil as Bridge Player  
 Allan Conrad as Third Officer  
 Robert Elliott as Detective Clancy 
 Bess Flowers as Woman at Bar
 Grace Goodall as Bridge Player  
 Douglas Gordon as Steward  
 Maude Turner Gordon as Mrs. Curtis  
 Dell Henderson as Customs Officer  
 Colin Kenny as Ship's Officer  
 James B. 'Pop' Kenton as Bridge Player  
 Slim Martin as Orchestra Leader  
 Richard Powell as Riley - Customs Officer 
 Gloria Roy as Passenger  
 Reginald Sheffield as Oscar's Friend  
 Edwin Stanley as Oscar's Friend  
 Libby Taylor as Betty - Millicent's Maid  
 Silvia Vaughan as Stewardess 
 Marion Weldon as Passenger

References

Bibliography
 Aubrey Solomon. The Fox Film Corporation, 1915-1935: A History and Filmography. McFarland, 2011.

External links
 

1935 films
1935 drama films
American drama films
Films directed by Allan Dwan
Fox Film films
Seafaring films
American black-and-white films
Films scored by Samuel Kaylin
1930s English-language films
1930s American films